The 2013 IIHF U20 Challenge Cup of Asia was the second IIHF U20 Challenge Cup of Asia, an annual international ice hockey tournament held by the International Ice Hockey Federation (IIHF). It took place between 7 and 9 June 2013 in Khabarovsk, Russia. Japan won the tournament after winning both of their round robin games and finishing first in the standings. Russia, represented by the MHL Red Stars, finished second and South Korea finished in third place.

Standings

Fixtures
All times local.

References

External links
International Ice Hockey Federation

Chal
IIHF Challenge Cups of Asia
2013
Asia
Asian ice hockey competitions for junior teams